Claudia Wurzel (born 1 May 1987)  is an Italian rower. At the 2012 Summer Olympics, she competed in the Women's coxless pair with Sara Bertolasi, finishing in 4th place in final B.

References

External links
 

1987 births
Living people
Italian female rowers
Olympic rowers of Italy
Rowers at the 2012 Summer Olympics